Kocalar is a village in the Batman District of Batman Province in Turkey. The village had a population of 1,014 in 2021.

References 

Villages in Batman District
Kurdish settlements in Batman Province